The Count Bishops were a British rock band, formed in 1975 in London and which broke up in 1980. The Count Bishops had limited commercial success, but forged an important stylistic and chronological link between the root rhythm and blues band Dr. Feelgood and the proto punk sound of Eddie and the Hot Rods; together forming the foundation of the pub-rock scene, which influenced the emergence of punk rock. The group made history in England by releasing the first record from independent label Chiswick Records. They splintered following the death of guitarist Zenon DeFleur on 18 March 1979.

History
The Count Bishops formed in spring 1975 when members of the group Chrome joined the American vocalist Mike Spenser. In July of that year, Spenser (née Scolnick) called fellow countryman Johnny Guitar from Paris for five days straight and finally convinced him to pack up two Les Pauls and fly to the UK and join up with Spenser and Zenon DeFleur (so named by Johnny after seeing him passed out on the floor at their first recording session). They found Steve Lewins (bass) and Paul Balbi (drums) within a few weeks. The new line-up recorded the next month at Pathway Studios with Barry Farmer at the desk and of these 13 tracks, four became the Speedball EP, the first release of Chiswick Records.

Shortly before the release (on Dutch label Dynamite) of the single "Taking it Easy" (released in the UK as "Train, Train"), Spenser left the band after an incident involving a glass door and his boot. Johnny and Zen handled lead vocals for the next year, including on the Dutch release "Good Gear" on the Dynamite label.  After recording the backing tracks for their first LP on Chiswick, they decided to bring over Dave Tice (formerly of Australian band Buffalo). With this lineup, the group finished recording its debut UK album, and toured heavily making a name for themselves and bringing to a new level their traditional influences of the 1960s: beat music (the Beatles, the Rolling Stones) and garage rock (the Standells, the Strangeloves).

For the rest of 1977, the Count Bishops toured continuously (including the support slot on the first Motörhead tour and John Cale's tour that year, as well as their own shows) and built a formidable army of fans - despite the fact that they did not fit the mold considered against the backdrop of old-fashioned punk movement. In the spring of 1978, they signed up for a live album with the participation of six groups of the Chiswick Records roster. The project was not fully realised, but the label released it as a mini-album called Live Bishops, reducing the band name to the Bishops. With this material (and a new bass player Pat McMullan, who replaced Steve Lewins) the Count Bishops toured extensively.

In 1978, two singles ("I Take What I Want" and "I Want Candy") led the Count Bishops to an appearance on the TV show Top of the Pops. A few days after the release of their album Cross Cuts, which had been a year and a half in production, Zenon Hierowski crashed his Aston Martin and died on 17 March 1979, and instead of the anticipated "breakthrough" the Bishops were forced to retrench.  They toured with Blitz Krieg (of Blast Furnace fame) deputising for Zen, and then Paul Balbi (drums) was deported back to Australia after returning from a Spanish festival.  The band carried on with Charlie Morgan (Tom Robinson Band, Elton John) on drums and just Johnny on guitar for some months, including a tour of Australia with Balbi, but Zen's death had taken much of the impetus away and they split up.

Discography

EPs
Speedball (1975)
Rollin' with the Count Bishops (2006)

Albums
The Count Bishops (1977)
Good Gear (1977)
Live (1978)
Cross Cuts (1979)
Speedball Plus 11 (1995)

Compilation albums
The Best of the Count Bishops (1995)

Reception
"The Count Bishops were a fine, energetic, R&B-based band capable of kicking out a fierce racket of noise that sounded like a grimier version of seminal British R&B revivalists Dr. Feelgood." (John Dougan, Allmusic)
"The sound of the Bishops in sensitive rockabilly mode has a swirling darkness and a restless rhythm, and it rattles by as hellbound as any classic blues locomotive." (Dave Thompson, Allmusic)
"This solid, unpretentious debut album belongs in the home of every fan of English R&B from the Yardbirds to the Pretty Things to Dr. Feelgood." (John Dougan, Allmusic)
"A laconic sneer, a greaseball grind, and one of the hottest guitarists of the age." (Dave Thompson, Allmusic)

References

External links

 Homepage (out of date)

British indie rock groups
Garage punk groups
English new wave musical groups
Musical groups from London
British pub rock music groups